Lake Emily may refer to places:
United States
Lake Emily, Wisconsin, a ghost town
Lake Emily (Portage County, Wisconsin), a lake 
Lake Emily (Dodge County, Wisconsin), a lake
Lake Emily (Le Sueur County, Minnesota), a lake in Le Sueur County, Minnesota
Lake Emily (McLeod County, Minnesota), a lake in McLeod County, Minnesota
Lake Emily, (Mendocino County, California, a lake in  Mendocino County, California